Wildomar is a city in southwest Riverside County, California, United States. The city was incorporated on July 1, 2008. As of the 2020 census, the population was 36,875. The community has grown very quickly during the early twenty-first century; the population has more than doubled since the 2000 census, when the community was still an unincorporated census-designated place.

History

In the summer of 1880 when, looking down from the peak of Mt. Baldy, Franklin Heald of Pasadena first noticed Lake Elsinore, then known as La Laguna. A few months later, in October, Frank Kimbal of San Diego signed an agreement with the Atchison, Topeka and Santa Fe Railroad to build a rail line past the lake from San Diego to Barstow, then known as Waterman.

The next winter, Heald traveled by buggy to see La Laguna (Lake Elsinore) at the same time work commenced on the rail line from San Diego skirting the lakeshore. The new line was to be known as the California Southern Railroad. Rails and spikes were brought from Antwerp, Belgium, and locomotives came from the Eastern Seaboard. The line was completed as far as Colton on August 14, 1882. The new train service was destined to bring development to the Wildomar area, then known as the southern portion of the Rancho La Laguna.

Heald found that the Rancho La Laguna could be purchased, with the exception of some  owned by the Machado family, from the London and San Francisco Bank for $24,000. On July 3, 1883, Heald paid $1,000 as a down payment on the area. He then brought in William Collier and Donald Graham as partners. The remaining debt was paid off shortly thereafter.

The railroad placed a boxcar, known as "Car B", off to the north-west side of the mainline near what is now Clinton Keith Road on January 1, 1884. For a number of years, this served as the railroad depot for the area that was to become Wildomar.

Heavy rains in the winter of 1884 left as much as  washing out the railroad tracks below Temecula as well as along the San Jacinto River and Railroad Canyon near the shore of Lake Elsinore. Flood damage broke the California Southern Railroad financially. The Santa Fe Railroad came to the rescue.  Santa Fe took over the rail line and rebuilt it by the beginning of 1885. The rail line through Wildomar became part of the Atchison, Topeka and Santa Fe Railroad.

In January 1885, Collier, Graham, and Heald made a map of Blocks K, L and M of the Elsinore area, recording the maps with San Diego County in October of that year. Heald took full interest in the unsold land to the north-west of the Corydon Road line.

Collier and Graham made a map of the Wildomar townsite in December 1885, recording it with San Diego County on November 20, 1886. The name Wildomar was derived by combining the names of the new town's founders, Wil for William Collier, do for Donald Graham, and mar for Margaret Collier Graham, wife of Donald Graham and sister of William Collier.

In 1886 a new school was built, along with a post office and railroad depot. By 1887, Wildomar could boast a large hotel, livery stable, blacksmith shop, numerous stores, a lumber yard, and a park. A Methodist-Episcopalian church was built in 1888 across from the new school just north-west of Central Avenue. In October 1887, Collier and Graham made a map of the Santa Rosa addition to Wildomar, an addition of about  purchased from Parker Dear, owner of the Rancho Santa Rosa who was attempting to develop a town he called Linda Rosa further south on the rail-line. This new map was recorded February 10, 1892, in the San Diego County records.

By the start of the 20th century, Wildomar even had its own newspaper, The Transcript. The railroad, however, continued to be plagued by washouts and within a few years, the rail connection south from Temecula to San Diego were abandoned. With fewer trains, Wildomar's development slowed. Then, in 1935, rail service to Wildomar was abandoned and the rails were pulled up back to Pinacate. Wildomar was almost a forgotten community. Then, in 1985, the Temecula Valley Freeway (I-15) was completed, bringing with it a new wave of interest in the area. Once again, Wildomar had begun to grow and experience new prosperity.

The citizens of Wildomar and Sedco Hills voted on February 5, 2008, to incorporate. Wildomar became the 25th city in Riverside County on July 1, 2008.

Geography
Wildomar is located at  (33.607460, -117.260193).

Demographics

2010
The 2010 United States Census reported that Wildomar had a population of 32,176. The racial makeup of Wildomar was 22,372 (69.5%) White (53.6% Non-Hispanic White), 1,065 (3.3%) African American, 376 (1.2%) Native American, 1,454 (4.5%) Asian, 69 (0.2%) Pacific Islander, 5,124 (15.9%) from other races, and 1,716 (5.3%) from two or more races. Hispanic or Latino of any race were 11,363 persons (35.3%).

The Census reported that 32,134 people (99.9% of the population) lived in households, 38 (0.1%) lived in non-institutionalized group quarters, and 4 (0%) were institutionalized.

There were 9,992 households, out of which 4,399 (44.0%) had children under the age of 18 living in them, 5,982 (59.9%) were opposite-sex married couples living together, 1,178 (11.8%) had a female householder with no husband present, 645 (6.5%) had a male householder with no wife present. There were 604 (6.0%) unmarried opposite-sex partnerships, and 59 (0.6%) same-sex married couples or partnerships. 1,600 households (16.0%) were made up of individuals, and 752 (7.5%) had someone living alone who was 65 years of age or older. The average household size was 3.22. There were 7,805 families (78.1% of all households); the average family size was 3.58.

The population was spread out, with 8,966 people (27.9%) under the age of 18, 3,256 people (10.1%) aged 18 to 24, 8,346 people (25.9%) aged 25 to 44, 8,194 people (25.5%) aged 45 to 64, and 3,414 people (10.6%) who were 65 years of age or older. The median age was 34.6 years. For every 100 females, there were 97.6 males.  For every 100 females age 18 and over, there were 95.9 males.

The homeowner vacancy rate was 2.7%; the rental vacancy rate was 5.1%. 23,369 people (72.6% of the population) lived in owner-occupied housing units and 8,765 people (27.2%) lived in rental housing units.

According to the 2010 United States Census, Wildomar had a median household income of $60,219, with 13.0% of the population living below the federal poverty line.

2000
As of the census of 2000, there were 14,064 people, 4,572 households, and 3,694 families residing in the community. The racial makeup of the community was 82.1% White, 1.8% African American, 0.9% Native American, 1.8% Asian, 0.3% Pacific Islander, 9.1% from other races, and 4.0% from two or more races. Hispanic or Latino of any race were 21.6% of the population.

There were 4,572 households, out of which 40.3% had children under the age of 18 living with them, 67.4% were married couples living together, 9.4% had a female householder with no husband present, and 19.2% were non-families. 14.6% of all households were made up of individuals, and 7.3% had someone living alone who was 65 years of age or older. The average household size was 3.06 and the average family size was 3.38.

The population was spread out, with 30.2% under the age of 18, 6.8% from 18 to 24, 28.7% from 25 to 44, 20.6% from 45 to 64, and 13.8% who were 65 years of age or older. The median age was 36 years. For every 100 females, there were 98.2 males. For every 100 females age 18 and over, there were 94.8 males.

The median income for a household in the community was $49,081, and the median income for a family was $51,964. Males had a median income of $42,549 versus $30,262 for females. The per capita income for the community was $20,190. About 6.3% of families and 8.2% of the population were below the poverty line, including 10.3% of those under age 18 and 2.8% of those age 65 or over.

Economy

Top employers
, the top employers in the city were:

Politics

In the California State Senate, Wildomar is in the 32nd district.

Services

Hospitals
Inland Valley Medical Center, a Southwest Healthcare System facility, is a General Acute Care Hospital in Wildomar with Basic Emergency Services and a Level II Trauma Center.

Cemetery
The Wildomar Cemetery District maintains a cemetery in the town. In 2011, the city of Wildomar proposed to take over management of the cemetery district and accomplished the takeover in November of that year.

Library 
The Wildomar Library is one of 35 branches in the Riverside County Library System. 
The library opened in 2001 and was originally called the Mission Trail Library. In 2014, the County Board of Supervisors voted to change the name to the Wildomar Library.

Transportation 
Interstate 15 bisects the city of Wildomar. Riverside Transit Agency provides local bus service to Wildomar, with Routes 8 and 23 serving the city.

Public safety

The Riverside County Sheriff's Department's Lake Elsinore Valley Regional Station contracts police services for the city.

The city of Wildomar contracts for fire and paramedic services with the Riverside County Fire Department through a cooperative agreement with CAL FIRE.

Education
Public schools in Wildomar are part of the Lake Elsinore Unified School District.

Elementary schools 
 Donald Graham Elementary School
 Ronald Reagan Elementary School
 Wildomar Elementary School 
 William Collier Elementary School
 Sycamore Academy of Science and Cultural Arts

Middle schools 
 David A. Brown Middle School

High schools 
 California Lutheran High School
 Elsinore High School

Higher education 
There are plans for a new Mt. San Jacinto College (MSJC) campus in Wildomar, located on Clinton Keith Road between Salida del Sol and Elizabeth Lane.

Flora

Wildomar has a variety of native plants. Hills are covered with coastal sage scrub and chaparral plant communities, along with the California Poppy. California sycamore grow along riverbeds, providing shade for ferns and mosses.

References

External links

  Wildomar, Cal., Promotional Map, Collier and Graham, San Francisco, (1887) from Huntingon Digital Library website hdl.huntington.org. 
  Map of Elsinore San Diego County, California, (1883-1893) from Huntingon Digital Library website hdl.huntington.org.

 
Cities in Riverside County, California
Elsinore Trough
Incorporated cities and towns in California
Populated places established in 2008